Erin Hanson is an Oregon-based artist, considered to be the originator of painting style called "Open Impressionism." Her landscape paintings have been shown internationally and at solo and group exhibitions and museums worldwide.

Early years 
Born in 1981, Erin began painting as a young lady, learning oils, watercolor, pen and ink, pastels and life drawing from art instructors. She began commissioning portraits of her neighbor's pets at age 10 and by age 12, she was employed after school by a mural studio, learning the techniques of acrylics on the grand scale of 40-foot canvases. Her first encounter with the Vincent van Gogh painting "Irises" in elementary school was decisive and marked the beginning of her appreciation for Impressionism. A high school scholarship took her to Otis College of Art and Design where she focused on figure drawing. Although Hanson was interested in art at an early age, she didn't consider it a career when it came time for college. She took a few art classes at the University of California, Berkeley but majored in bio-engineering. Hanson says that although she enjoyed her courses in subjects such as microbiology, the actual work in the field seemed mundane. After graduation, Hanson moved to Las Vegas, Nevada where she began an import business, but her rock climbing and hiking hobbies ultimately led her back to her childhood passion for painting.

Technique 
Hanson is credited as the pioneer and originator of "Open Impressionism," a style of painting that encompasses wide brush strokes and an alla prima technique where the paint is applied wet on wet without letting earlier layers dry. During an interview, Hanson said, "I am not trying to re-create a photograph, I am trying to get my viewers to open their eyes and see their world a little differently." Hanson's typical style mixes paint from a limited palette of four or five colors with minimal brush strokes. Hanson has said her creative process starts with hours of preparation before she begins painting. During an interview, Hanson said she takes dozens of reference photos, which she can later use in the studio before she paints.

Subjects and influences 
Hanson's paintings depict the natural beauty of the United States and around the world, but her roots are in the American West. Her frequent trips to National Parks and other places in nature include backpacking expeditions, rock climbing and photo safaris. Hanson has mentioned that she has been inspired by Red Rock Canyon near Las Vegas, Nevada and Mojave Desert in Southern California. Hanson has said that she uses the outdoors to inspire her work. She visits the Colorado plateau every year, backpacking and hiking through areas such as Zion National Park, Canyon de Chelly, and Monument Valley. Other places captured in her paintings include Paso Robles, Joshua Tree National Park and the Anza-Borrego Desert. For her paintings, Hanson transforms the landscapes into abstract mosaics of color and texture, her impasto application of paint lending a sculptural effect to the art. Sunsets and dawns continue to serve as a source of inspiration for Hanson's work, as do rocks, which often translate into abstracted shapes that form a mosaic of colors on her canvases.

Shows and exhibitions 
Hanson's work has been displayed in multiple fine art galleries and museums such as the St. George Art Museum, La Salle University Art Museum, Mattatuck Art Museum and Bone Creek Museum of Agrarian Art. Her painting "Desert in Color" won Best of Show at the 2019 Cowgirl Up! art show in Wickenburg, Arizona, which features top women artists from across the nation.

References

External links 
 

1981 births
Living people
Artists from California
Impressionist painters